The Immigration History Research Center (IHRC) is an interdisciplinary research center in the College of Liberal Arts at the University of Minnesota.

Founded in 1965, the IHRC promotes research on migration with a special emphasis on immigration to the U.S. It sponsors seminars, lectures and workshops that bring highly specialized researchers from the academic world into dialogue with each other and with university and high school students and their teachers, with journalists, photographers and filmmakers, and with communities of immigrants and ethnic Americans. The IHRC especially seeks to enrich contemporary debates about international migration—so often heated, emotional, and unrelated to facts—from historical and scholarly perspectives.

The IHRC is proud to have built one of the largest and most important collections of materials documenting U.S. immigration and refugee life to be found anywhere in the world. It yearly welcomes not only student and faculty researchers from the University and from Minnesota communities but researchers from a wide variety of disciplines from North America and the wider world.

References

External links
 Immigration History Research Center

University of Minnesota